Woodhall or Old Woodhall, is a small village located about  south west of Horncastle, Lincolnshire, England.

Woodhall, along with Woodhall Spa, was created a civil parish in 1889 comprising portions of Langton, Woodhall, Thimbleby, and Thornton.  In 1894 Woodhall and Woodhall Spa were separated, forming two civil parishes, the boundary between them being the Reeds Beck Road. Woodhall is now part of the civil parish of Stixwould and Woodhall .

The church of Saint Margaret was built in the 14th century and may have once been part of the moated manorial complex of Woodhall Hall. The church declared redundant by the Diocese of Lincoln in 1971, and was demolished in 1972.

There is a medieval moated site which represents the site of Woodhall Hall, which is an ancient scheduled monument.

Darwood House is a grade II listed farmhouse dating from the 15th century with 17th and 19th century alterations.

References

Villages in Lincolnshire
East Lindsey District